The National Museum of Brazil collections include an exhibition of meteorites discovered in Brazil and other countries.

One of the most important meteorites that was on display is the Bendegó meteorite, which weighs over 5,000 kg and was discovered in 1784. It survived the fire that destroyed the museum in 2018, sustaining no major damage.

See also 

 National Museum of Brazil

References 

 
Meteorites found in Brazil
Meteorites found in the United States
Meteorites found in Australia
Meteorites found in Russia